West Java is a province of Indonesia on the western part of the island of Java, with its provincial capital in Bandung. West Java is bordered by the province of Banten and the country's capital region of Jakarta to the west, the Java Sea to the north, the province of Central Java to the east and the Indian Ocean to the south. With Banten, this province is the native homeland of the Sundanese people, the second-largest ethnic group in Indonesia.

West Java was one of the first eight provinces of Indonesia formed following the country's independence proclamation and was later legally re-established on 14 July 1950. In 1966, the city of Jakarta was split off from West Java as a 'special capital region', with a status equivalent to that of a province, while in 2000 the western parts of the province were in turn split away to form a separate Banten province.

Even following these split-offs, West Java is the most populous province of Indonesia with a population of 48,274,160 as of the 2020 Census, which grew to 48,782,402 at mid 2021 according to the official estimates. The province's largest cities, Bekasi (a satellite city within the Jakarta metropolitan area) and Bandung, are the third and fourth most populous cities in Indonesia respectively. Bandung is also one of the most densely populated cities proper in the world.

History 

The oldest human inhabitant archaeological findings in the region were unearthed in Anyer on the western coast of Java with evidence of bronze and iron metallurgical culture dating to the first millennium AD. The prehistoric Buni culture, near present-day Bekasi, developed clay pottery with evidence found in Anyer to Cirebon. Artefacts dated 400 BC — AD 100, such as food and drink containers, were found mostly as burial gifts. There is archaeological evidence in Batujaya Archaeological Site dating from the 2nd century and, according to Dr Tony Djubiantono, the head of Bandung Archaeology Agency, Jiwa Temple in Batujaya, Karawang, was also built around this time.

One of the earliest known recorded histories in Indonesia is from the former Tarumanagara kingdom, where seven, fourth-century stones are inscribed in Wengi letters (used in the Pallava period) and in Sanskrit describing the kings of the kingdom Tarumanagara. Records of Tarumanegara lasted until the sixth century, which coincides with the attack of Srivijaya, as stated in the Kota Kapur inscription (AD 686).

The Sunda Kingdom subsequently became the ruling power of the region, as recorded on the Kebon Kopi II inscription (AD 932).

An Ulama, Sunan Gunung Jati, settled in Cirebon, intending to spread Islam in the town. Meanwhile, the Sultanate of Demak in Central Java grew to become a threat to the Sunda kingdom. To defend against the threat, Prabu Surawisesa Jayaperkosa signed the Luso-Sundanese Treaty with the Portuguese in 1512. In return, the Portuguese were granted access to build fortresses and warehouses in the area, as well as forming trading agreements with the kingdom. This first international treaty of Sunda Kingdom with the Europeans was commemorated by the placement of the Padrao stone monument at the bank of the Ciliwung River in 1522.

Although the treaty with the Portuguese had been established, it could not come to realisation. Sunda Kalapa harbour fell under the alliance of the Sultanates of Demak and Cirebon (former vassal state of Sunda kingdom) in 1524 after forces under Paletehan alias Fadillah Khan had conquered the city. In 1524–1525, troops under Sunan Gunung Jati also seized the port of Banten and established the Sultanate of Banten which was affiliating with Demak. The war between the Sunda kingdom with Demak and Cirebon sultanates continued for five years until a peace treaty was made in 1531 between King Surawisesa and Sunan Gunung Jati. From 1567 to 1579, under the last king Raja Mulya, alias Prabu Surya Kencana, the Sunda kingdom declined, under pressure from Sultanate of Banten. After 1576, the kingdom could not maintain control over its capital at Pakuan Pajajaran (present-day Bogor), and gradually the Sultanate of Banten took over the former Sunda kingdom's territory. The Mataram Sultanate from Central Java also seized the Priangan region, the southeastern part of the kingdom.

In the 16th century, Dutch and British trading companies established trading ships in western Java after the fall of the Sultanate of Banten. For the next three hundred years, western Java fell under the Dutch East Indies' administration. West Java was officially declared as a province of Indonesia in 1950, referring to a statement from Staatblad number 378. On 17 October 2000, as part of nationwide political decentralisation, Banten was separated from West Java and made into a new province. There have been recent proposals to rename the province Pasundan ("Land of the Sundanese") after the historical name for West Java.

Administrative divisions 

Since the creation of West Java Province, the province of West Java was subdivided into four cities and sixteen regencies, excluding the four regencies which were separated off in 2000 to form the new Banten Province. Subsequently five new independent cities were created between 1996 and 2002 by separation from their surrounding regencies - Bekasi on 16 December 1996, Depok on 27 April 1999, Cimahi and Tasikmalaya on 21 June 2001, and Banjar on 11 December 2002. A 17th regency was formed on 2 January 2007 – West Bandung Regency – from the western half of Bandung Regency, and an 18th regency was formed in October 2012 – Pangandaran Regency – from the southern half of Ciamis Regency. 

These 9 cities and 18 regencies are divided into 620 districts, which comprise 1,576 urban villages and 4,301 rural villages. On 25 October 2013, the People's Representative Council (DPR) began reviewing draft laws on the establishment of 57 prospective new regencies (and eight new provinces), including a further three regencies in West Java – South Garut (Garut Selatan), North Sukabumi (Sukabumi Utara) and West Bogor (Bogor Barat) – but none of these three prospective regencies are shown separately on the map below, nor in the following table.

Notes: (a) the 2005 population is included in the total for Bandung Regency, of which West Bandung Regency was formerly part. (b) the 2005 population total for Ciamis Regency include the figure for the new Pangandaran Regency, created in 2012.

Geography 

West Java borders Jakarta and Banten province to the west and Central Java to the east. To the north is the Java Sea. To the south is the Indian Ocean. Unlike most other provinces in Indonesia which have their capitals in coastal areas, the provincial capital, Bandung, is located in the mountainous area in the centre of the province. Banten Province was formerly part of West Java but was created a separate province in 2000. West Java, in the densely populated western third of Java, is home to almost one out of every five Indonesians.

West Java and Banten provinces, as a part of the Pacific Ring of Fire, have more mountains and volcanoes than any of the other provinces in Indonesia. The vast volcanic mountainous region of inland West Java is traditionally known as Parahyangan (also known as Priangan or Preanger) which means "The abode of hyangs (gods)". It is considered as the heartland of the Sundanese people. The highest point of West Java is the stratovolcano Mount Cereme (3,078 meters) bordering Kuningan and Majalengka Regencies. West Java has rich and fertile volcanic soil. Agriculture, mostly traditional dry rice cultivation (known as ladang or huma), has become the primary way of life of traditional Sundanese people. Since the era of the Dutch East India Company (VOC), West Java has been known as a productive plantation area for coffee, tea, quinine, and many other cash crops. The mountainous region of West Java is also a major producer of vegetables and decorative flowering plants. The landscape of the province is one of volcanic mountains, rugged terrain, forest, mountains, rivers, fertile agricultural land, and natural sea harbours.

Flowing through Bandung Basin to the northeast is Citarum River, the longest and most important river in the province. This 300-km long river is the site of three dams, namely Cirata Dam, Saguling Dam, and Jatiluhur Dam.

Economy 
Initially, the economy of the Sundanese people in West Java relied heavily on rice cultivation. Ancient kingdoms established in the province such as the Tarumanagara and Sunda Kingdom are known to have relied on rice taxes and agriculture revenues. The cycle of life of the ancient Sundanese people revolved around the rice crop cycle. Traditional rice harvest festivals such as the Seren Taun were important. The ancient goddess of rice, Nyai Pohaci Sanghyang Asri, is revered in Sundanese culture. Traditionally, Sundanese people often used dry rice cultivation (ladang). After the Mataram expanded to the Priangan area in the early 17th century following the Sultan Agung campaign against Dutch Batavia, sawah (wet rice cultivation) began to be adopted in the northern lowlands of West Java. Regencies such as Indramayu, Cirebon, Subang, Karawang and Bekasi are now well known as vital rice-producing areas. The mountainous region of West Java supplies vegetables, flower and much horticultural produce to Jakarta and Bandung, while animal farms in West Java produce dairy products and meats.

Colonial period 
During the entire Dutch colonial era, West Java fell under Dutch administration centred in Batavia. The Dutch colonial government introduced cash crops such as tea, coffee, and quinine. Since the 18th century, West Java (known as "De Preanger") was known as a productive plantation area and became integrated with global trade and economy. Services such as transportation and banking were provided to cater for wealthy Dutch plantation owners. West Java is known as one of the earliest developed regions in the Indonesian archipelago. In the early 20th century, the Dutch colonial government developed infrastructures for economic purposes, especially to support Dutch plantations in the region. Roads and railways were constructed to connect inland plantations area with urban centres such as Bandung and the port of Batavia.

Post independence 
After Indonesian independence in 1945, West Java became a supporting region for Jakarta, the capital of Indonesia. Jakarta remained as the business and political centre of Indonesia. Several regencies and cities in West Java such as Bogor, Bekasi and Depok were developed as supporting areas for Jakarta and came to form the Greater Jakarta area or Jabodetabek (Jakarta, Bogor, Depok, Tangerang and Bekasi). The northern area of West Java has become a major industrial area, with areas such as Bekasi, Cikarang and Karawang sprawling with factories and industries. The area in and around Bandung has also developed as an industrial area.

Natural resources 

Based on the data from Indonesia State Secretary, the total area of rice fields in West Java Province in 2006 was 9,488,623 km which produced 9,418,882 tons of paddy in 2006, consisting of 9,103,800 tons rice field paddy and 315,082 tons farmland paddy. Palawija (non-rice food) production, reached 2,044,674 tons with productivity 179.28 quintal per ha. Nevertheless, the widest plant's width is for corn commodity which reaches 148,505 ha. West Java also produces horticulture consists of 2,938,624 tons vegetables, 3,193,744 tons fruits, and 159,871 tons medicines plants/ bio pharmacology.

Forest in West Java covers 764,387.59 ha or 20.62% from the total size of the province. It consists of productive forest 362,980.40 ha (9.79%), protected forest 228,727.11 ha (6.17%), and conservation forest 172,680 ha (4.63%). Mangrove forest reaches 40,129.89 ha, and spread in 10 regencies where coasts are available. Besides, there is also another protected forest of about 32,313.59 ha organised by Perum Perhutani Unit III West Java and Banten.

From the productive forest, in 2006 West Java harvested crop of about 200,675 m³ wood, although the need for wood in this province every year is about 4 million m³. Until 2006, populace forest's width 214,892 ha with wood production is about 893,851.75 m³. West Java also produces non-forest's crop which is potential enough to be developed as forestry work, such as silk, mushroom, pine, dammar, maleleuca, rattan, bamboo, and swallow bird's nest.

In the fishery sector, commodities include goldfish, nila fish, milkfish, freshwater catfish, windu shrimp, green mussel, gouramy, patin, seaweed and vaname shrimp. In 2006, this province harvested 560,000 tons of fish from fishery cultivation crop and brackish or 63.63% from fishery production total in West Java.

In the poultry field, dairy cow, domestic poultry, and ducks are common commodities in West Java. 2006 data stated that there are 96,796 dairy cows (25% of the national population), 4,249,670 sheep, 28,652,493 domestic poultries, and 5,596,882 ducks (16% of the national population). Now there are only 245,994 beef cattle in West Java (3% national population), whereas the need every year is about 300,000 beef cattle.

This province has many plantation crops, such as tea, cloves, coconut, rubber, cacao, tobacco, coffee, sugar, palm and akar wangi (Chrysopogon zizanioides). From all those commodities, cloves, coconut, rubber, cocoa, tobacco, and coffee are common in West Java. From area side, the best productivity, that is plan area's width equals with the plant's width that produces tobacco and sugar palm commodities. From the production side, the highest productivity is oil palm (6.5 tons per ha) and sugar palm (5.5 tons per ha).

West Java also has several mining operations. In 2006, it contributed 5,284 tons zeolite, 47,978 tons bentonite, iron sand, pozzolan cement, feldspar, and jewel barn/ gemstone. Precious stone mining potential generally is found in Garut, Tasikmalaya, Kuningan, and Sukabumi Regency areas.

As consequences of having many volcanoes, West Java has the potential of geothermal energy. There are eleven points of geothermal energy, and three, i.e. Papandayan, Ceremai, and Gede Pangrango have conducted pre-exploration.

Raw natural resources include chalk, several offshore oilfields in the Java Sea, and lumber. Most of the province is very fertile, with a mix of small farms and larger plantations. There are several hydropower dams, including Jatiluhur, Saguling, Cirata, and Jatigede.

Tourism 

Tourism is an important industry in West Java, and the Bandung and Puncak areas have long been known as popular weekend destinations for Jakartans. Today, Bandung has developed into a shopping destination, popular not only among locals, but also with neighbouring Malaysian and Singaporean visitors. The history-rich coastal city of Cirebon is also a cultural tourism destination since the city has several kratons and historical sites such as Gua Sunyaragi. Other tourist destinations include the Bogor Botanical Garden, Safari Park of Indonesia, Tangkuban Perahu crater, Pelabuhanratu Bay, Ciater hot springs, Kawah Putih crater to the south of Bandung, Pangandaran beach, and various mountain resorts in Cianjur, Garut, Tasikmalaya, and Kuningan.

Demographics 

The population of West Java was 43,053,732 at the 2010 Census and 48,274,160 at the 2020 Census, making it the most populous province of Indonesia, home to 18% of the national total on 1.8% of the country's land. Aside from the special district of Jakarta, it is the most densely populated province in the country with an average of 1,364.5 people per km2 (2020 Census). The average annual population growth rate recorded in the ten years to 2010 was 1.9%,

Ethnic and linguistic composition 

West Java is the native homeland of Sundanese people which forms the largest ethnic group in West Java. Since Jakarta and the surrounding area, including West Java, is the business and political centre of Indonesia, the province has attracted various people from other parts of Indonesia. The biggest minority is Javanese who migrated to the province centuries ago. Other Native Indonesian ethnic groups such as Minangkabau, Batak, Malay, Madurese, Balinese, Ambonese and many other Indonesians who migrated to and settled in West Java cities can also be easily found. The urban areas also have a significant population of Chinese Indonesians.

In addition to Indonesian, the official national language, the other widely spoken language in the province is Sundanese. In some areas near the southern borders with Central Java, Javanese is also spoken. The main language spoken in Cirebon and nearby areas (Majalengka, Indramayu, Sumber) is Cirebonese, a dialect of Javanese with Sundanese influence.

Indonesian is widely spoken as a second language.

Religion

Cultures 
The Sundanese share the Java island with the Javanese and primarily live in West Java. Although the Sundanese live on the same island as the Javanese, their culture is distinct and likewise consider themselves to live in a separate cultural area called Pasundan or Tatar Sunda. Someone moving from West Java to Central or East Java is literally said to be moving from Sunda to Java worlds. Bandung is considered as the cultural heartland of Sundanese people, and many indigenous Sundanese artforms were developed in this city. The nearby province of Banten is similar in this regard and is also considered to be part of Pasundan as well.

Music

Gamelan orchestra 

The musical arts of Sunda, which is an expression of the emotions of Sundanese culture, express politeness and grace of Sundanese. Degung orchestra consists of Sundanese gamelan.

In addition to the Sundanese forms of Gamelan in Parahyangan, the region of Cirebon retains its own distinct musical traditions. Amongst Cirebons' varying Gamelan ensembles the two most frequently heard are Gamelan Pelog (a non-equidistant heptatonic tuning system) and Gamelan Prawa (a semi-equidistant pentatonic tuning system). Gamelan Pelog is traditionally reserved for Tayuban, Wayang Cepak, and listening and dance music of the Kratons in Cirebon, while Gamelan Prawa is traditionally reserved for Wayang Purwa.

Cirebon also retains specialised Gamelan ensembles including Sekaten, which is played in the Kratons to mark important times in the Islamic calendar, Denggung, also a Kraton ensemble, which is believed to have some "supernatural powers", and Renteng, an ensemble found in both Cirebon and Parahyangan known for its loud and energetic playing style.

Zither ensembles 

Tembang Sunda is a genre of Sundanese vocal music accompanied by a core ensemble of two Kacapi (zither) and a Suling (bamboo flute). The music and poetry of tembang Sunda are closely associated with the Parahyangan, the highland plateau that transverses the central and southern parts of Sunda. The natural environment of Priangan, an agricultural region surrounded by mountains and volcanoes, is reflected in some songs of the tembang Sunda.

Kacapi suling is tembang Sunda minus vocal.

Tarawangsa is a genuine popular art is performed on ensemble consists of tarawangsa (a violin with an end pin) and the jentreng (a kind of seven-stringed zither). It is accompanied by a secret dance called Jentreng. The dance is a part of a ritual celebrating the goddess of paddy Dewi Sri. Its ceremonial significance is associated with a ritual of thanksgiving associated with the rice harvest. Tarawangsa can also be played for healing or even purely for entertainment.

Bamboo ensembles 

The three main types of Sundanese bamboo ensembles are angklung, calung, karinding and arumba. The exact features of each ensemble vary according to context, related instruments, and relative popularity.

Angklung is a generic term for sets of tuned, shaken bamboo rattles. Angklung consists of a frame upon which hang several different lengths of hollow bamboo. Angklungs are played like handbells, with each instrument played to a different note. Angklung rattles are played in interlocking patterns, usually with only one or two instruments played per person. The ensemble is used in Sundanese processions, sometimes with trance or acrobatics. Performed at life-cycle rituals and feasts (hajat), angklung is believed to maintain balance and harmony in the village. In its most modern incarnation, angklung is performed in schools as an aid to learning music.

The Angklung received international attention when Daeng Soetigna, from Bandung, expanded the angklung notations not only to play traditional pélog or sléndro scales but also diatonic scale in 1938. Since then, angklung is often played together with other Western musical instruments in an orchestra. One of the first well-known performances of angklung in an orchestra was during the Bandung Conference in 1955.

Like those in angklung, the instruments of the calung ensemble are of bamboo, but each consists of several differently tuned tubes fixed onto a piece of bamboo; the player holds the instrument in his left hand and strikes it with a beater held in his right. The highest-pitched calung has the highest number of tubes and the densest musical activity; the lowest-pitched, with two tubes, has the least. Calung is nearly always associated with earthy humour, and is played by men.

Arumba refers to a set of diatonically tuned bamboo xylophones, often played by women. It is frequently joined by modern instruments, including a drum set, electric guitar, bass, and keyboards.

Theatre 

Wayang golek is a traditional form of puppetry from Sunda. Unlike the better-known leather shadow puppets (wayang kulit) found in the rest of Java and Bali, wayang golek puppets are made from wood and are three-dimensional, rather than two. They use a banana palm in which the puppets stand, behind which one puppeteer (dalang) is accompanied by his gamelan orchestra with up to 20 musicians. The gamelan uses a five-note scale as opposed to the seven-note western scale. The musicians are guided by the drummer, who in turn is guided by signals from the puppet master dalang gives to change the mood or pace required. Wayang golek are used by the Sundanese to tell the epic play "Mahabarata", and various other morality-type plays.

Sandiwara Sunda is a type folk teather performed in Sundanese and presenting Sundanese themes, folklores and stories.

Dance 

Sundanese dance shows the influence of the many groups that have traded and settled in the area over the centuries, and includes variations from graceful to dynamic syncopated drumming patterns, quick wrist flicks, sensual hip movements, and fast shoulder and torso isolations.
Jaipongan is probably the most popular traditional social dance of Sundanese people. It can be performed in solo, grups, or pair.
The Tari Merak (Peafowl Dance) is a female dance inspired by the movements of a peafowl and its feathers blended with the classical movements of the Sundanese dance.

Folktales and legend stories 

There are stories and folktales transcribed from Pantun Sunda stories.
Among the most well-known folktale and stories are:

Mundinglaya Dikusumah, which tells of Mundinglaya visiting Jabaning Langit to find layang Salaka Domas. It is a symbolic story of Surawisesa visiting Malaka to establish a peace treaty with the Portuguese before 1522.
Lutung Kasarung, tells the life of a beautiful princess, in the era of Pasir Batang kingdom, a vassal of Sunda kingdom. She faces the evil of her older sister willing to seize her right as a queen.
Ciung Wanara, tells of the fight of two princes of Sunda kingdom and the history of Cipamali river (present-day Brebes river) as a boundary between Sundanese and Javanese territories.
Sangkuriang, which tells the story of the creation of Mount Tangkuban Parahu and the ancient lake Bandung.
 Nyai Loro Kidul (also spelt Nyi Roro Kidul) is a legendary female spirit or deity, known as the Queen of the Southern Sea of Java (Indian Ocean or Samudra Kidul south of Java island) in Sundanese as well in Javanese mythology.

Literature 
Old Sundanese literature, among others, are:

Bujangga Manik, which was written on 29 palm leaves and kept in the Bodleian Library in Oxford since 1627, mentioning more than 450 names of places, regions, rivers and mountains situated on Java island, Bali island and Sumatra island.
Carita Parahyangan, telling Sundanese kings and kingdoms from the pre-Islamic period.
Siksakandang Karesian, providing the reader with all kinds of religious and moralistic rules, prescriptions and lessons.

Human Development Index 

Cities and Regencies in West Java range high to medium Human Development Index (HDI).

Transportation

Toll roads 

Due to its proximity to Jakarta and its growing population and industry, West Java has the longest tolled highway road of any provinces. As of April 2015, there are several toll roads in West Java
Jakarta–Cikampek Toll Road (73 km)
Cipularang Toll Road (58.5 km)
Padaleunyi Toll Road (33 km)
Jagorawi Toll Road (46 km)
Palimanan–Kanci Toll Road (28.8 km)
Bogor Ring Road (partially built)
Cinere–Jagorawi first section (3.7 km, as part of Jakarta Outer Ring Road 2)
Kanci–Pejagan Toll Road (35 km)
Cikopo–Palimanan Toll Road (116 km)
Soreang–Pasir Koja Toll Road (10.6 km)
Bogor–Ciawi–Sukabumi Toll Road (built: Bogor-Cigombong) (15.3 km)
In addition to completed highways there are some highways that are being built, one of them is Cileunyi–Sumedang–Dawuan (Cisumdawu) with length 60.1 kilometres.

Several other proposed toll roads are Bandung Intra-Urban Toll Road, Cileunyi–Tasikmalaya, and Jakarta Outer Ring Road 2 (a section of this road has been built).

Railways 
Most cities and towns in West Java are served with narrow-gauge (mainly 1067mm) lines and connected to other provinces on Java Island. Jakarta's KRL Commuterline electric suburban trains run into the province to Bogor and Cikarang.

A high-speed railway, connecting Jakarta and Bandung, is now under construction.

Air 

Bandung Husein Sastranegara International Airport serves direct domestic flights to Batam, Pekanbaru, Medan, Bandar Lampung, Surabaya, Yogyakarta, Denpasar, Semarang, Banjarmasin, Makassar, and also international services to/from Kuala Lumpur and Singapore. The Kertajati International Airport in Majalengka Regency is built to replace the Husein Sastranegara Airport and to ease air traffic at Soekarno–Hatta International Airport in Jakarta.

Education 

West Java is one of the most popular destinations for higher education in Indonesia. It has many well-known universities joined by many students from the entire country. Some of which are:
Bandung Institute of Technology
University of Indonesia
Bogor Agricultural University
Indonesia University of Education
Padjadjaran University
Parahyangan Catholic University
University of Indonesia
 UIN Sunan Gunung Djati

References

Bibliography

External links 

Official site 
Official site

 
States and territories established in 1950
Provinces of Indonesia
1950 establishments in Indonesia